The South Georgia diving petrel or Georgian diving-petrel (Pelecanoides georgicus) is one of five very similar small auk-like diving petrels of the southern oceans. It is native to the South Atlantic and islands of the southern Indian Ocean and south-eastern Australia.

Taxonomy and nomenclature
The American ornithologist Robert Cushman Murphy and the zoologist Francis Harper described the South Georgia diving petrel in 1916. Its specific name, georgicus, is derived from the South Georgia islands where they identified the species. Other common names include puffinure de Géorgie du Sud (French), Breitschnabel Lummensturmvogel (German), and potoyunco de Georgia (Spanish). A unique New Zealand population is now considered a separate species, the Whenua Hou diving petrel.

Description
Its plumage is black above and dull white below, and it has a stubby black bill with pale blue edges. The wings have thin white strips. The face and neck can be more brown than black. The legs are blue with posterior black lines down the tarsi. Unless seen very close, it is almost indistinguishable from the common diving petrel; the common diving petrel has brown inner web primary feathers, whereas the South Georgia diving petrel has light inner web feathering. Common diving petrels have smaller and narrower bills than the South Georgia diving petrel, and there are also slight size differences.

Distribution and habitat
This species nests in colonies on Subantarctic islands. It breeds on South Georgia in the south Atlantic and on the Prince Edward Islands, Crozet Islands, Kerguelen Islands and Heard Island and McDonald Islands in the southern Indian Ocean. It disperses to surrounding seas and vagrants have been recorded in the Falkland Islands and Australia. While  nesting burrows are usually built on scree slopes above the vegetation line, they are occasionally built on flat land.

Behaviour

The South Georgia diving petrel feeds primarily on planktonic crustaceans, particularly krill, but will also feed on small fish and young cephalopods. Breeding season is October–February. The female lays one egg that is incubated for 44–52 days. Fledging occurs in 43–60 days. Threats to the South Georgia diving petrel include skuas, cats and rats. South Georgia diving petrels are noted for their diving capabilities: "The most proficient divers of the order Procellariformes are likely to be the diving petrels in the family Pelecanoididae."

References

External links

South Georgia diving petrel
Birds of islands of the Atlantic Ocean
Birds of the Indian Ocean
Birds of the Campbell Islands
Birds of subantarctic islands
Fauna of the Prince Edward Islands
Fauna of Heard Island and McDonald Islands
Fauna of the Crozet Islands
Fauna of the Auckland Islands
South Georgia diving petrel
South Georgia diving petrel
Taxonomy articles created by Polbot